{{DISPLAYTITLE:C16H22N2O2}}
The molecular formula C16H22N2O2 (molar mass: 274.36 g/mol) may refer to:

 4-Acetoxy-DET
 4-Acetoxy-MiPT
 Isamoltane (CGP-361A)

Molecular formulas